The South Atlantic Conference women's basketball tournament is the annual conference women's basketball championship tournament for the South Atlantic Conference. The tournament has been held annually since 1991. It is a single-elimination tournament and seeding is based on regular season records.

The tournament champion receives the conference's automatic bid to the NCAA Women's Division II Basketball Championship.

Results

Notes 
 † Wingate's championship from 2012 has been vacated.

Championship records

 Coker, Emory & Henry, Limestone, and UVA Wise have not yet reached the finals of the SAC tournament.
 Brevard and Queens (NC) never reached the finals of the tournament while members of the SAC.
 Schools highlighted in pink are former SAC members.

See also
 South Atlantic Conference men's basketball tournament

References

NCAA Division II women's basketball conference tournaments
Tournament
Recurring sporting events established in 1991